"Love is on a Roll" is a song written by Roger Cook and John Prine, and recorded by American country music artist Don Williams.  It was released in March 1983 as the first single from the album Yellow Moon.  The song was Williams' fourteenth number one on the country chart.  The single went to number one for one week and spent a total of twelve weeks on the country chart.

Charts

Weekly charts

Year-end charts

References

1983 songs
Don Williams songs
1983 singles
Songs written by Roger Cook (songwriter)
Songs written by John Prine
Song recordings produced by Garth Fundis
MCA Records singles